Caecum rehderi is a species of minute sea snail, a marine gastropod mollusk or micromollusk in the family Caecidae.

Description

Distribution
This marine species occurs off French Polynesia.

References

 Pizzini, M. & Raines, B., 2011. The Caecidae from French Polynesia with description of eight new species(Caenogastropoda: Rissooidea). Bollettino Malacologico 47: 23-46

Caecidae
Gastropods described in 2005